Liam Aaron Zammit (born 27 January 1981) is a former Australian cricketer. He played 3 first-class cricket matches for New South Wales in the 2003 – 2004 season, scoring 32 runs and taking 5 wickets.

Zammit has earlier represented New South Wales and Australia in the Under-17 and Under-19 competitions. Primarily a spin bowler specialising in the leg break googly, Zammit's fielding and lower-order batting subsequently gained him an all-rounder status. In 2001-02, Zammit took 32 wickets representing Penrith District Cricket Club and became the second highest wicket-taker amongst all spinners in Sydney Grade Cricket.

See also
 List of New South Wales representative cricketers

References

External links
 

1981 births
Australian cricketers
New South Wales cricketers
Sportsmen from New South Wales
Living people